Lily Ho is a Hong Kong actress from Hong Hong. Ho is a Miss Hong Kong 2007 contestant and winner of Miss Tourism Ambassador. Ho is known for her role as Sammi in Pages of Treasures.

Career 
In 2007. Ho was a contestant of Miss Hong Kong 2007, she won the Miss Tourism Ambassador special award but was not placed. In 2008, Ho began her acting career. She left TVB in 2015 after her contract ended.

Filmography

Television

Films 
This is a partial list of films.
 2010 72 Tenants of Prosperity - Lucky, Sales of Qiu Tian Zhan
 2010 Perfect Wedding
 2015 Return of the Cuckoo 
 2016 Buddy Cops

See also 
 Kayi Cheung, Miss Hong Kong 2007

References

External links
 Lily Ho's blog at tvb.com

1988 births
Hong Kong film actresses
Living people
TVB actors